Charles John Hexamer, Ph.D. (May 9, 1862 - October 15, 1921) was the president of the National German-American Alliance from 1901 to 1917.

Biography
He was born on May 9, 1862 in Philadelphia, Pennsylvania to Mary and Ernst Emil Julius Ferdinand Hexamer. He married Annie Josephine Haeuptner in 1890 in Philadelphia.

In 1901 Hexamer co-founded the National German-American Alliance, where he was its first president until 1917. In 1904 he received from Wilhelm II, German Emperor the 4th order of the Red Eagle for his activity on behalf of German Kultur.

He died on October 15, 1921 in Philadelphia, Pennsylvania. He was buried in Grove Church Cemetery in North Bergen, New Jersey.

External links

References

American people of German descent
1862 births
1921 deaths
People from Philadelphia
Burials at Grove Church Cemetery